From the team's first match in July 2006 to its last match in February 2008, nineteen players represented the Nevis cricket team in Twenty20 matches. A Twenty20 is a cricket match between two representative teams of one twenty-over innings per side. Unlike in most other sports, the two constituent islands that make up the Federation of Saint Kitts and Nevis are independently represented and field separate teams in West Indian domestic cricket. Nevis, represented by the Nevis Cricket Association, is a full member of the Leeward Islands Cricket Association, and Nevis competes regularly in regional tournaments. All five of the team's matches came in the Stanford 20/20 competition, which was held twice (in 2006 and 2008).

Key

List of players
All statistics refer only to Twenty20 matches played for Nevis.

List of captains

References

Twenty20
Nevis, Twenty20
Cricketers